The Magnificent Tree is the third studio album by the Belgian band Hooverphonic, released on 26 September 2000. The cover features the band in front of a tree in the town of Kieldrecht, Belgium.

Four singles were released from the album: "Mad About You", "Vinegar & Salt", "Out of Sight" and "Jackie Cane". The "Vinegar & Salt" and "Out of Sight" singles contain "Green" and "Sunday Morning", respectively, tracks composed for The Magnificent Tree that did not make it onto the final release. By November 2002, the album had sold 265,000 copies worldwide, including 85,000 copies in Belgium alone.

The U.S. release includes the track "Renaissance Affair" as a bonus track, which also originates from their previous album Blue Wonder Power Milk.

Background 
The album cost 8,000,000 Bef ($170,000) to record, one of the most expensive Belgian albums ever, partly because the first three weeks of recording were thrown away, as the group were apparently heading in the wrong direction. The record company hoped to sell 500,000 copies, much more than the 150,000 of the previous two albums (the band just received a gold album for 25,000 copies of "Blue Wonder Power Milk" in Belgium).

Composition 
"The Magnificent Tree" contains a sample of "Guinnevere" (misspelled as Guinevere) by Crosby, Stills and Nash. "Waves" is remarkably similar to "Changes", a 1966 psychedelic pop song by The Association. Vinegart & Salt contains a sample of Je Me Repose.

Critical reception 

The Magnificent Tree holds a score of 57 out of 100 on the review aggregator website Metacritic based on reviews from four critics, indicating "mixed or average reviews". MTV.com felt that, with the album, "Hooverphonic's sound has become increasingly hip and cosmopolitan, slowly processing out everything that made it so alluring in the first place", noting that "the nagging sense of something menacing behind these songs has practically disappeared." Conversely, according to AllMusic, "Classic embryonic vocalic beauty from Geike Arnaert still carries the translucence of the band's signature ethereality" and "songs such as 'Out of Sight' and 'Mad About You' are thoroughly dramatic and make for an illustrious listen".

Track listing

Personnel 
Hooverphonic
 Geike Arnaert – vocals
 Raymond Geerts – guitars
 Alex Callier – keyboards, bass, programming, string arranged on Vinegar & Salt, production

Guests
 Michiel Dutré - cello on Frosted Flake Wood
 Youseff Yansy - theremin on Jackie Cane & theremin and trumpet on L'Odeur Animale
 Luis Jardim - percussion
 Eric Bosteels - additional drums
 Phil Chill - drum programming on Autoharp & Mad About You
 Gota Yashiki - additional drum programming on Pink Fluffy Dinosaurs & cymbal and percussion on Out of Sight
 Dan Lacksman - Fairlight programming and analog FX
 Matt Dunkley - strings on Mad About You & Out of Sight
 Gavyn Wright - 1st violin
 Perry Montague-Mason - 2nd violin
 Chris Tombling, Simon Fisher, Rebecca Hirsh, Jackie Shave, Eddy Roberts, Vaughan Armon, Dermot Crehan, Ben Cruft, Cathy Thompson, Pat Kiernan, Boguslav Kostecki, Mark Berrow - violin
 Peter Lale - 1st viola
 Bruce White, Bruce White, Bob Smissen, Katie Wilkinson - viola
 Tony Pleeth - 1st cello (misspelled as celli)
 Dave Daniels, Justin Pearson, Paul Kegg - cello
 Mary Scully, Paul Morgan - basses
 Children choir on Jackie Cane - Sarah and Catherine Butterfield, Elliot, Lewis and Chelsea Carpenter, Caitlin May Harris, Paris Starr

Charts

Weekly charts

Year-end charts

Certifications

References

2000 albums
Hooverphonic albums
Epic Records albums